Maria Luisa Gabriella of Savoy (25 March 1729 – 22 June 1767) was a princess of Savoy.

Biography

Maria Luisa was the second daughter born to the reigning King of Sardinia and his second wife, the German Princess Polyxena of Hessen-Rheinfels-Rotenburg who died in 1735, Marie Luisa being just five years of age. She was named after her aunt, Maria Luisa Gabriella of Savoy (1688–1714) who was Queen of Spain as wife of Philip V of Spain.

Her maternal cousins included Victor Amadeus I, Prince of Carignano and his younger sister the future princesse de Lamballe, both of whom were born at the court of Savoy. Her paternal cousins included Ferdinand VI of Spain, who was king of Spain at the time of her birth.

Like her older sister, Eleonora, Maria Luisa was a proposed bride for Louis, Dauphin of France. The Dauphin was the eldest son of Louis XV of France who in turn was her first cousin.

The marriage between linking the rulers of France and Savoy never materialised, Louis marrying an Infanta of Spain who died in childbirth and then a Princess of Saxony. Like all her sisters, Savoy would remain unmarried, dying at the age of 38 in Turin. She was buried at the Royal Basilica of Superga overlooking Turin. Her father died in 1773 and her oldest brother Victor Amadeus of Savoy succeeded as King.

Ancestry

References and notes

External links

1729 births
1767 deaths
Nobility from Turin
Princesses of Savoy
Burials at the Basilica of Superga
Daughters of kings